First Pennsylvania Bank was a bank based in Philadelphia, Pennsylvania. Founded in 1782, it was for centuries the oldest bank in the United States until it was acquired by CoreStates Financial Corporation in 1989.

In the 1970s, First Pennsylvania officials attempted to turn their firm, then a "sedate regional bank", into a major national concern. Aggressive and risky lending and investments turned the bank into Philadelphia's largest, but in 1980, led to huge losses and panicked depositors. The federal government gave the bank a $500 million bailout, the first major federal bailout of a national bank.

See also

List of bank mergers in the United States

References

Banks based in Pennsylvania
Defunct banks of the United States